Love for Sale (Spanish:Amor vendido)  is a 1951 Mexican musical film directed by Joaquín Pardavé and starring Fernando Fernández, Meche Barba and Óscar Pulido.

Cast
 Fernando Fernández as Raúl  
 Meche Barba as Adriana 
 Óscar Pulido as Temístocles  
 Sara Guasch as La Mamy  
 Manolo Hernandez as Manolo 
 Carlos Múzquiz as Detective Policía  
 Eva Garza as Cantante  
 Pascual García Peña as Don Pedro Nolasco  
 Armando Velasco as Doctor de la Fuente  
 Jorge Mondragon as Juez  
 Carlos Valadez as Carlos Vela, el perfumado  
 Freddy Fernández as Pichi  
 Toña la Negra as Cantante 
 Víctor Manuel Castro as Concursante baile  
 Rafael Icardo as Don Fernando  
 Inés Murillo as Vecina  
 Juan Orraca as Detective policía  
 Sergio Prado 
 Victorio Blanco as Custodio  
 Flora Alicia Campos as Vecina  
 Rogelio Fernández as Complice del Perfumado 
 Salvador Godínez as Complice del perfumado  
 Georgina González as Espectadora juicio  
 Ángel Infante as Mesero 
 Carmen Manzano as Vecina 
 Ignacio Peón as Vecino  
 Roberto G. Rivera as Detectove policía  
 José Wilhelmy as Concursante baile

References

Bibliography 
 Deborah R. Vargas. Dissonant Divas in Chicana Music: The Limits of la Onda. University of Minnesota Press, 2012.

External links 
 

1951 films
1951 musical films
Mexican musical films
1950s Spanish-language films
Films directed by Joaquín Pardavé
Mexican black-and-white films
1950s Mexican films